Centini is a surname of Italian origin. Notable people with this surname include:

 Felice Centini (1562–1641), Italian Roman Catholic cardinal
 Maurizio Centini, O.F.M. Conv. (1592 – 1639), Italian Roman Catholic Bishop of Mileto (1631–1639) and then Bishop of Massa Lubrense

See also 
 Centi (disambiguation)